The 2007 Westmeath Senior Hurling Championship was held in County Westmeath, Ireland. The championship was held between the top hurling clubs in the county.

First round
Winners from this round proceed to Section A. Losers go to Section B.

Second round

Group A
Winners of Round 1 play in round robin

Group B
Losers of Round 1 play in round robin

Knock-Out Stages

Westmeath Senior Hurling Championship
Westmeath Senior Hurling Championship